Richard Browning is a British inventor and the creator of the Daedalus Flight Pack "jet suit". He is the founder and chief test pilot of Gravity Industries, his company that designs and builds the invention.

Education
Browning was educated at Queen's College, a boarding and day independent school for boys (now co-educational) in the county town of Taunton in Somerset, followed by Cardiff University, where he initially studied Engineering and then, after one Semester, switched to Exploration Geology.

Career
Browning set out in 2016 to experiment with the concept “using the human mind to balance and control the body in flight structure”, adding power in the form of micro gas turbines (jet engines). His development journey, culminating in the first flight in November 2016, was the subject of a 2017 TED talk and the “Taking on Gravity” publication.

Browning received initial investment and launched the company Gravity Industries in April 2017 together with WIRED magazine and Red Bull. Public demonstrations of the invention included over 100 flight events across 33 countries. He was referred to as a "real-life Iron Man” by several media outlets.

TIME magazine featured the jet suit as amongst the best inventions of 2018.

Gravity Industries was recognized by Guinness World Record for the fastest flight in a body-controlled jet suit in November 2019 at 85 mph (135kmph).

Gravity Industries received a $640,000 investment from Tim Draper and Adam Draper after the first public demonstration outside Draper Associates & Boost VC offices at Hero City in San Mateo.

Gravity Industries is now a permanent team of seven based in Salisbury, UK and has a support network around the world. The company business model includes TV & media work, commercial events & displays, brand collaborations, STEM initiatives, and public flight training & flight experiences in the UK and US. Gravity also has a wide range of partnerships with the UK, the US and European militaries, and a range of search & rescue organizations.

The company was planning to launch the Gravity Race Series in March 2020 in Bermuda, but this was postponed due to the COVID-19 pandemic.

Gravity's jet suit was named the Daedalus suit, a name chosen by Browning's son when he was aged eight, in reference to Daedalus of Greek mythology, although  the name is not used on the company's website.

Personal life
Prior to founding Gravity, Browning was a Royal Marines reservist for 6 years and an oil trader with British Petroleum for 16 years. He is married and has 2 children.

Selected publications
Taking on Gravity: A Guide to Inventing the Impossible from the Man Who Learned to Fly (2021,)

References

External links 
 Gravity Industries Official Website

21st-century British inventors
Living people
1979 births
Alumni of Cardiff University
Jet pack
People educated at Queen's College, Taunton